Krišjānis Barons Memorial Museum is a museum in Riga, Latvia. The museum is dedicated to the folklorist Krišjānis Barons and was established on October 31, 1985.

External links
Official site

Museums in Riga
Museums established in 1985
Biographical museums in Latvia
1985 establishments in Latvia